Mro is a Unicode block containing characters for writing the Bangladesh Mru language.

History
The following Unicode-related documents record the purpose and process of defining specific characters in the Mro block:

References 

Unicode blocks